The Department for Promotion of Industry and Internal Trade (DPIIT) is a central government department under the Ministry of Commerce and Industry in India. It is responsible for formulation and implementation of promotional and developmental measures for growth of the industrial sector, keeping in view the national priorities and socio-economic objectives. While individual administrative ministries look after the production, distribution, development and planning aspects of specific industries allocated to them, DPIIT is responsible for the overall industrial policy. It is also responsible for facilitating and increasing the foreign direct investment (FDI) flows to the country.

The department in its current form came into being on 27 January 2019, when the erstwhile Department of Industrial Policy & Promotion was renamed to Department for Promotion of Industry and Internal Trade (DPIIT) after internal trade was added to its mandate.

The current Minister is Piyush Goyal while the top bureaucrat is Shri. Anurag Jain, IAS.

History
The department was originally established in 1995, and was reconstituted in the year 2000 with the merger of Department of Industrial Development.

DPIIT is the nodal Department in Government of India for coordinating and implementing programmes with the United Nations Industrial Development Organization (UNIDO) in India. The department also coordinates with apex Industry Associations such as Federation of Indian Chambers of Commerce and Industry, Confederation of Indian Industry, ASSOCHAM in their activities relating to promotion of industrial cooperation and to stimulate FDI into India.

Responsibilities

Stimulating Investments

New Industrial Policy
It is currently working to frame a new industrial policy, to be the third such policy in India since its independence in 1947. However, the deadline for completing the policy has been repeatedly pushed back since January, 2018.

India Investment Grid
The department has created an online portal called the India Investment Grid (IIG), an interactive investment portal providing details of sectors, states and projects in which domestic and foreign investors may sink in capital. in association with Invest India, India's national investment and facilitation agency. The initiative not only allows investors across the globe to easily search, identify and track investment worthy projects, but also allows promoters to highlight their projects along with requirements like funds, technology and collaboration needs with global audience.

Boosting Startup growth
The department is the nodal body for the Startup India initiative, which aims to make India a hub for startups. It aims to discard restrictive States Government policies within this domain, such as License Raj, Land Permissions, Foreign Investment Proposals, and Environmental Clearances.

According to the government, the focus areas include reduction in patent registration fees, freedom from mystifying inspections for first 3 years of operation, freedom from Capital Gain Tax for first 3 of operation, as well as self-certification compliance.

The government has loosed the norms for startups and their backers to seek exemption from Angel Tax. But the tax remains. Almost 14,000 startups have been registered by DPIIT through its portal.

Framing E-Commerce Rules
The department is currently framing the e-commerce policy, a set of rules aimed at streamlining and regulating the digital business ecosystem.

Intellectual Property Rights
DPIIT is also responsible for intellectual property rights relating to patents, designs, trademarks, copyrights, and geographical indication of goods, and oversees the initiative relating to their promotion and protection.

Criticism

Falling FDI growth
However, the department has faced criticism for not publishing FDI figures since June, 2018, despite the Reserve Bank of India (RBI) providing it with regular inputs. Earlier, this data was published every quarter. This happens at a time the country has seen inbound FDI dropping for the first time under the Narendra Modi government, Business Standard newspaper has revealed.

The DPIIT compiles total investment inflows with the data from the RBI as well as its own databases. The last time they published this data was in August last year; that was for the April–June period. Officials at the department refused to explain why the data had not been released.

Low Startup competitiveness
Media has pointed out the policy has failed to boost job growth while most startups were unable to receive what they wanted most, tax exemptions.

References

External links
Official website

Government agencies of India
Policies of India
Ministry of Commerce and Industry (India)